The Arab fountain of Alcamo is very ancient (together with Cuba delle Rose, the Arab Cuba of Vicari and the Piccola Cuba of Palermo), and  is still functional: it was built during the period of the Arab domination of the town. It is located in the lower part of Alcamo, at about 300 metres from the Sanctuary of Madonna of Miracles.

History 
In 1154, in a passage of the Book of Roger, written by the Arab geographer Idrisi, the town of Alcamo was defined a manzil (that is a casale or group of houses) with fertile lands and a prosperous market. In this period, this hamlet (=casale) was called "Alqamah".

The town centre was inhabited by Muslims and subdivided into four casalia: San Vito, San Leonardo, Sant'Ippolito and San Nicolò del Vauso (which later became feudal hamlets). These casalia became then Christians, after the Arabs were expelled by Frederick II, Holy Roman Emperor because of their rebellions. 

The Fountain of  San Vito was built by the Arabs near a water spring, in the hamlet of Alqamah; but at the end of the 15th century there was a big earthquake, that probably damaged the fountain, which afterwards was restored. Later the residential area concentrated around the Castle of the Counts of Modica; near the fountain they started the activity of  pastoralism which led to the  construction of an abreuvoir.

Description 
In the façade there are two sinks, with two spouts (cannoli) and lesenes surmounted by capitals. The abreuvoir, realized with carved limestone ashlars, was built in the first half of the 19th century.

The restoration works, completed in 2015, have given a greater valorisation of the characteristic road that, leaving from  Piazza Ciullo, leads as far as the Sanctuary of Madonna of Miracles, where in May believers  go there on pilgrimage to pray their patroness.

Restoration 
Thanks to the fundings received through  G.A.L. (gruppo di azione locale), aimed to the requalification of the cultural sites in the rural landscape of the territory of Alcamo (among which there are also the Cuba delle Rose and the holy aedicules), they could restore and valorize the site of the ancient Arab fountain; the  planning was predisposed by the engineers of the municipality of Alcamo.

References

Sources

Other projects

External links 

Fountains in Italy
Buildings and structures in Alcamo
Emirate of Sicily